James Delaney (born March 12, 1953) is a former professional tennis player from the United States. During his career, he won 1 doubles title.

Delaney played college tennis at Stanford University. His younger brother Chris was also a touring pro.

Grand Prix and WCT career finals

Singles (0–1)

Doubles (1–2)

External links
 
 

American male tennis players
Sportspeople from Newton, Massachusetts
Stanford Cardinal men's tennis players
Tennis people from Massachusetts
1953 births
Living people
20th-century American people